Coler Specialty Hospital is a chronic care facility on New York City's Roosevelt Island that provides services such as rehabilitation and specialty nursing. The hospital was formed in 1996 by the merger of two separate chronic care hospitals on Roosevelt Island.  Goldwater Memorial Hospital, on the south end of the island, closed in 2013, while Bird S. Coler Hospital is still located on the north end of the island.

Facilities

Bird S. Coler Specialty Hospital
Bird S. Coler Hospital (referred to more recently as Coler Specialty Hospital and Nursing Facility) opened in 1952 and occupies most of the north tip of the island. According to city officials, there were no immediate plans to close the north campus. The number of beds has increased from 500 to 815 to, as of 2012, 1,025; in 2020 they were described as "one of the largest public nursing facilities in the world."

They received part of the Federal government's post Hurricane Sandy funding of "$1.6 Billion for Storm Improvements."

Goldwater Memorial Hospital
Goldwater Memorial Hospital opened in 1939 as the Welfare Hospital for Chronic Disease on a 9.9 acre (4.0 hectare) tract just south of the Queensboro Bridge. The hospital, which included a medical library, was named for Dr. S.S. Goldwater, the New York City Hospitals Commissioner responsible for the hospital complex master plan, in 1942. It operated as a center for polio survivors, providing needed long-term care. One of its patients, Harriet Bell lived there from 1954 to 1979 and served on the hospital board as president for four terms, assisting in the drafting of the Patient's Bill of Rights.

In mid-August 1972, the movie The Exorcist began principal photography at Goldwater, shooting a scene where Jason Miller as Father Karras and Titos Vandis as his uncle argue about the care Karras's aging mother is receiving.

Goldwater was built on city-owned land, and shut its doors on December 31, 2013 to provide for the new Cornell Tech campus. The hospital's closure and patient relocation was first announced in 2010, and demolition began in January 2014 with the removal of asbestos.

References

External links 
 

Hospital buildings completed in 1939
Hospital buildings completed in 1952
Hospitals in Manhattan
Roosevelt Island
NYC Health + Hospitals
Defunct hospitals in Manhattan